John Alexander Dickman (17 May 1864 – 10 August 1910) was an Englishman hanged for murder.

He was convicted of the murder of John Innes Nisbet, which took place on a train travelling between Newcastle railway station and Alnmouth railway station, on 18 March 1910. Nisbet had been carrying a bag containing the wages for a colliery. His body was discovered in a train compartment in a full-width compartment carriage (with no aisle and no corridor); he had died of five gunshot wounds to the head and his bag had been stolen along with over £300 of colliery wages that were never recovered although the near empty bag was found in a local mineshaft with only a few coins inside.

On 6 July Dickman was convicted by a jury of the murder of Nisbet and he was sentenced to death by Mr Justice Coleridge. Dickman's legal team launched an immediate but failed Court of Appeal July appeal. The Home Secretary, Winston Churchill refused to intervene and Dickman was hanged in Newcastle Prison on 10 August, the last man to be hanged in a Newcastle jail.

There was some doubt over the conviction, as it appeared to some people to rest on inconclusive identification evidence.  There was a campaign for him to be reprieved, with leaflets distributed in stations.  The writer C. H. Norman was among those who were convinced of John Dickman's innocence. It has also been claimed that Dickman's defence lawyer was incompetent.

The case is not widely remembered today.  However it did figure in the 1976 BBC television series Second Verdict, the 2008 television programme Nightwatch and the 2018 BBC television series Murder, Mystery and My Family (and Case Closed?). The latter programmes suggested that two witnesses who said they saw Dickman and Nisbet entering the same compartment may even have been the real killers.  In 2021, the case was the subject of episode 4 of Railway Murders.

Two episodes of the radio show The Black Museum hosted by Orson Welles were based on Dickman's case.  One, "The Tan Shoes" featured Sir John Gielgud and Sir Ralph Richardson.

However it has been suggested that Dickman was also guilty of two previous murders, of Caroline Mary Luard at Ightham, Kent in 1908 and Hermann Cohen in Sunderland in 1909.

See also
Franz Müller

References

Bibliography
 Diane Janes Edwardian Murder: Ightham and the Morpeth Train Robbery (2007) 
 John Eddleston The Murder of John Alexander Dickman (2012)

External links
Trial Of John Alexander Dickman
Spartacus Educational on the case

1864 births
1910 deaths
1910 murders in the United Kingdom
20th-century executions by England and Wales
English people convicted of murder
Executed English people
People convicted of murder by England and Wales